State elections were held in South Australia on 3 November 1906, apart from the Northern Territory, which voted on 10 November. This was a double dissolution election, and in the South Australian House of Assembly, all 42 seats were up for election. The incumbent United Labor Party (ULP) government led by Premier of South Australia Thomas Price with coalition partner the Liberal and Democratic Union (LDU) led by Archibald Peake, defeated the conservative opposition led by Leader of the Opposition Richard Butler. Each of the 13 districts elected multiple members, with voters casting multiple votes.

Background
The ULP became part of a unique "lab-lib" government, the Price-Peake administration minority government, following the 1905 election. The ministry was a coalition between the ULP led by Price, and the liberal group led by Peake. The deadlock over the franchise issue continued with the Legislative Council. After yet another attempt at reform, rejected by the Council, Price resigned his ministry, but when Butler, as leader of the opposition, was unable to form a ministry, Price/Peake remained in office. After more conflict with the Council, Price and Peake obtained an early election, and campaigned as a "ministerial alliance". At the same time, Peake agreed to pressure from within his group to form a new party – the Liberal and Democratic Union (LDU). This drew its membership from small wheat farmers, and at this stage, the LDU was firmly in favour of franchise reform, willing to be in coalition with the ULP, and opposed to both the conservative Australasian National League (ANL) and the Farmers and Producers Political Union (FPPU).

The ULP, on the fewest seats prior to the 1905 election, in just one election became the single largest party, increasing their primary vote to 41.3 (+22.2) percent and increasing their representation from five to 15 seats. After the new lower house first met, the ULP forced the incumbent conservative government to resign with the support of eight liberals. It was the start of the first stable Labor government in the world. In 1906, the ULP as the single largest party increased their primary vote to 44.8 (+3.5) percent with their seat representation increasing from 15 to 20 seats in the 42-member lower house, falling short by just two seats of a parliamentary majority. The ULP won all 12 city seats from the three city multi-member electorates, Adelaide, Port Adelaide and Torrens, with a policy of development and progress, expansion of business and honest government: "they would not be frightened by the nonsense that had been talked about socialism". The ULP continued to govern with the support of the LDU until Premier Price's death in 1909, after which Peake formed a minority government until the 1910 election when the ULP formed South Australia's first majority government.

Results

See also
 Members of the South Australian House of Assembly, 1906-1910
 Members of the South Australian Legislative Council, 1905–1908
 Members of the South Australian Legislative Council, 1908–1910

Notes

References
History of South Australian elections 1857-2006, volume 1: ECSA
Statistical Record of the Legislature 1836-2007: SA Parliament
State and federal election results in Australia since 1890

External links
The 13 electorates from 1902 to 1915: The Adelaide Chronicle

Elections in South Australia
1906 elections in Australia
1900s in South Australia
November 1906 events